George Paulet may refer to:
 Sir George Paulet (1553–1608), English soldier, administrator, and governor of Derry
 Lord George Paulet (1803–1879), officer of the Royal Navy
 George Paulet, 12th Marquess of Winchester (1722–1800), English courtier and nobleman

See also
 George Paulett (1534-1621), Jersey bailiff and temporary lieutenant-governor of Guernsey